Suhash Chandra Dutta Roy (born 1937) is an Indian electrical engineer and a former professor and head of the department of electrical engineering at the Indian Institute of Technology, Delhi. He is known for his studies on analog and digital signal processing and is an elected fellow of all the three major Indian science academies viz. Indian Academy of Sciences, Indian National Science Academy, National Academy of Sciences, India as well as the Institute of Electrical and Electronics Engineers, Institution of Electronics and Telecommunication Engineers, Systems Society of India and Acoustical Society of India, The Council of Scientific and Industrial Research, the apex agency of the Government of India for scientific research, awarded him the Shanti Swarup Bhatnagar Prize for Science and Technology, one of the highest Indian science awards for his contributions to Engineering Sciences in 1981.

Biography 

S. C. Dutta Roy, born on 1 November 1937 at Mymensingh in the Bengal region of the British India (presently in Bangladesh) to Suresh Chandra Roy and Suruchi Bala, did his college studies at the University of Calcutta. After graduating in physics with honors in 1956, he completed a master's degree in engineering (MTech) in 1959 at the Institute of Radio Physics and Electronics and enrolled for his doctoral studies at Calcutta University Rajabazar Science College. During his doctoral studies, he worked as a research officer at River Research Institute during 1960–61 and as a lecturer of physics at Kalyani University from 1962. It was during his service at Kalyani University, he received the degree of DPhil in radio physics and electronics in 1965. The same year, he moved to the US for his post-doctoral work and served as an assistant professor at the University of Minnesota till 1968. Returning to India, he joined the Indian Institute of Technology, Delhi in September 1968 as an associate professor of electrical engineering and served the institution for more than thirty years.

Starting his career at IIT Delhi in 1968 as associate professor, Dutta Roy served in various positions as a professor (1970—98), head of the department of electrical engineering (1970–73) and a dean of undergraduate studies (1983–86) till his regular superannuation from service in 1998. In between, he took two sabbaticals, the first during 1973-74 to serve as a visiting professor at University of Leeds and the other, as a visiting fellow at Iowa State University during 1978-79. Post-retirement, he served as an emeritus fellow during 1998—2004, as an INSA senior scientist during 2004–07 and as an INSA honorary science from 2007, all at IIT Delhi till 2010. Since then, he serves as an honorary scientist of the Indian National Science Academy.

Dutta Roy is married to Sudipta Datta and the couple has two children, Sumantra and Shoubhik. The family lives in Hauz Khas, in South Delhi.

Legacy 

Dutta Roy's principal areas of studies have been network synthesis, solid state circuits, distributed networking and signal processing and he is known to have done extensive researches on digital and analog signal processing. He focused on network studies during his doctoral days but shifted focus to RC circuit after he moved to Minnesota, particularly economic inductor simulation and low sensitivity circuits. It was during this period, he developed a method for calculating sensitivity in active and passive filters and introduced a network synthetic approach to variable frequency oscillators. From the seventies, his work was mainly on digital and analog signal processing. He holds three Indian patents for his work, and his researches have also assisted others in their work. His researches have been documented in several peer-reviewed articles; and ResearchGate, an online repository of scientific articles, has listed 306 of them. Besides, he has contributed chapters to three books, including the Volume 10 (Signal Processing and its Applications) of the Handbook of Statistics published by Elsevier and his work has been cited by many authors. He has also guided thirty doctoral scholars in their studies.
 
Dutta Roy has designed and authored video courses covering five semesters which are being promoted by National Programme on Technology Enhanced Learning, the e-learning platform of the Ministry of Human Resource Development, through their online learning platform. He has been associated with several government agencies as well as a number of international science journals such as International Journal of Circuit Theory and Applications, and Circuits and Systems journal. He was the guest editor for Issue 5 volume 34 of the Journal of Research of the Institution of Electronics and Telecommunication Engineers. He served as a member of the administrative council of the Indian National Science Academy in 2009 and is a member of the National Advisory Committee of Institute of Radio Physics and Electronics of the University of Calcutta. He has delivered invited or keynote speeches at many international seminars and conferences, the 54th Annual Meeting of Indian Association for the Cultivation of Science in 1989 and the 2013 International Conference on Signal Processing and Communication (ICSC 2013) organized by the Jaypee Institute of Information Technology featuring among them.

Chapters

Selected articles

Selected video lecture series

Awards and honors 
Dutta Roy received the Meghnad Saha Award and the Ram Lal Wadhwa Gold Medal, both Institution of Electronics and Telecommunication Engineers (IETE) honors, in 1973 and 1980 respectively. IETE would honor him again in 2015 with the Lifetime Achievement Award. In between, the Council of Scientific and Industrial Research awarded him the Shanti Swarup Bhatnagar Prize, one of the highest Indian science awards in 1981, the same year as he received the Vikram Sarabhai Research Award of the Physical Research Laboratory, followed by Om Prakash Bhasin Award in 1987 and Syed Hussain Zaheer Medal of the Indian National Science Academy in 1992. He received the Lifetime Achievement Award of the Systems Society of India in 2010. He is also a recipient of the Jawaharlal Nehru Award and the Distinguished Alumnus Award of the Institute of Radio Physics and Electronics, Calcutta University.

Dutta Roy, who is a former National Lecturer of the University Grants Commission of India, was elected as a fellow by the Indian National Science Academy in 1983 and he became a fellow of the Indian National Academy of Engineering in 1987. The Indian Academy of Sciences made him their elected fellow in 1988, followed by the National Academy of Sciences, India in 1990. In 1995, the Institution of Electronics and Telecommunication Engineers (IETE) made him a distinguished fellow of the institution. He is also an elected fellow of the Acoustical Society of India and Systems Society of India. The Indian Institute of Engineering Science and Technology, Shibpur awarded him the degree of Doctor of Science (Honoris Causa) in March 2016. The award orations delivered by Dutta Roy include 2009 Dr. Guru Prasad Chatterjee Memorial Lecture the Indian National Science Academy.

See also 

 Digital signal processing
 Analog signal processing

Notes

References

External links

Further reading 
 
 
 
 

Recipients of the Shanti Swarup Bhatnagar Award in Engineering Science
1937 births
Indian scientific authors
Bengali scientists
Fellows of the Indian Academy of Sciences
Indian electrical engineers
People from Mymensingh District
University of Calcutta alumni
Academic staff of the University of Kalyani
University of Minnesota faculty
Academic staff of IIT Delhi
Academics of the University of Leeds
Iowa State University faculty
Fellows of the Indian National Science Academy
Fellows of The National Academy of Sciences, India
Fellow Members of the IEEE
Living people
Fellows of the Indian National Academy of Engineering